Club Deportivo Ariznabarra is a Spanish football club based in Vitoria-Gasteiz, in the autonomous community of Basque Country. Founded in 1972, it currently plays in the Tercera División – Group 4, holding home games at Campo municipal de Ariznabarra.

Ariznabarra is a feeder club of Real Sociedad de Fútbol, their reference club in the city of Vitoria.

Famous players
Gaizka Toquero
Pedro Uralde

References

External links
Official website 
Team profile at futbolme.com 
Preferente de Alava 

Football clubs in the Basque Country (autonomous community)
Association football clubs established in 1972
Sport in Vitoria-Gasteiz